Haralds Marvē (9 November 1900 – 12 October 1983) was a Latvian sports shooter. He competed in the 25 m pistol event at the 1936 Summer Olympics.

References

External links
 

1900 births
1983 deaths
People from Amata Municipality
People from Kreis Riga
Latvian male sport shooters
Olympic shooters of Latvia
Shooters at the 1936 Summer Olympics